Madrid Maersk was the largest container ship at the time of launch, but was surpassed shortly after by the launch of OOCL Hong Kong, and she was the second container ship to surpass the 20,000-TEU threshold, after the MOL Triumph. She was built at the Daewoo Shipbuilding & Marine Engineering shipyard and was delivered in April 2017. Her first port on her maiden voyage was Port of Tianjin, China.

Madrid Maersk has a capacity of 20,568 TEUs and is the first of eleven second-generation Maersk Triple E-class container ships. Maersk Line, the company owner, is taking delivery of the remaining ten plus 17 additional smaller vessels to replace older ships through the end of 2018.

See also
Mærsk E-class container ship
Maersk Triple E-class container ship

References

Merchant ships of Denmark
Container ships
Ships of the Maersk Line
2017 ships